This table lists Korean players who have victories on the LPGA of Japan Tour. They do not include team events or unofficial events.

The list is complete through the 2020–21 season.

Events in bold are majors.

External links
 

LPGA of Japan Tour
Golf in South Korea